Harpooner was launched at Bristol in 1791. A French privateer captured her in 1793 on Harpooners first whaling voyage to the South Seas and took her into Boston. This gave rise to an important court case.

Career
Harpooner entered Lloyd's Register (LR) in 1791 with Ramsdall, master, changing to B. Folger, J. Caves, owner, and trade Bristol—South Seas fishery. Lloyd's List (LL) reported on 27 August 1793 that the French privateer Marsellois, of 22 guns and 180 men, from Dunkirk, had captured Harpooner and two Dutch vessels from the West Indies, and sent all three into Boston.

Court case
The case of Folger vs. Lecuyer was important because it resulted in the United States ending French extraterritorial rights with respect to privateers and their prizes.

On 6 December 1793, a federal court in Boston declared federal jurisdiction in the prize case involving the British whaler Harpooner. The French privateer Marseilles, Jacques Louis Lecuyer, master, of Le Havre, had seized. Unfortunately for the French, her captain was Brown Folger, who was a well-known whaler from Nantucket. Not only was he an American citizen, he was part owner of the cargo. Folger argued that his cargo was landed before the outbreak of war between France and Britain, and that Article 14 of the Franco-American Treaty of Amity  and Commerce exempted cargoes of whale oil. Lecuyer argued that the French Republic's consulate in Boston had jurisdiction based on the Treaty of Alliance of 1778 and the Consular Convention of 1787.

By its decision the Massachusetts District Court asserted Federal jurisdiction in Admiralty matters, and ended the French Republic's extraterritorial rights in such matters. Justice John Lowell ruled that it was not the intent of the Treaty to bind the United States and France to make common cause in all future wars that either country might engage in.

Notes

Citations

References
 
 
 
 

1791 ships
Whaling ships
Captured ships